Pauline Konga (born 10 April 1970) is a retired Kenyan long-distance runner. At the 1996 Summer Olympics she won the silver medal in the 5000 metres, making her the first Kenyan woman to win an Olympic medal.

Career
In 1990 she finished a dismal 125th at the 1990 World Cross Country Championships. In 1991 she improved to 15th at the 1991 World Cross Country Championships, and finished twelfth in 3000 metros at the 1991 World Championships. She also became Kenyan champion in cross-country running (long course). In 1992 she finished a lowly 90th at the 1992 World Cross Country Championships, but improved to seventh at the 1993 World Cross Country Championships, also winning the gold in the team competition.

Konga participated in her first Olympics in 1992, failing to progress from the heats in the 3000 metres. In 1996 she became Kenyan 5000 metres champion and finished third at the 1996 Grand Prix Final. At the 1996 Olympic Games she won the silver medal in the 5000 metres, becoming the first Kenyan woman to win an Olympic medal.

Her personal bests were 8:37.76  minutes in the 3000 metres, achieved in August 1996 in Monaco; 14:47.51 minutes in the 5000 metres, achieved in August 1996 in Köln; and 1:09:33 hours in the half marathon, achieved in January 1996 in Marrakech.

Personal life
She was born in Baringo District.  She is married to Paul Bitok, who won a silver medal in the men's 5000 metres at the 1996 Olympics.

References

External links
 

1970 births
Living people
Kenyan female long-distance runners
Athletes (track and field) at the 1992 Summer Olympics
Athletes (track and field) at the 1996 Summer Olympics
Olympic athletes of Kenya
Olympic silver medalists for Kenya
People from Baringo County
Medalists at the 1996 Summer Olympics
Olympic silver medalists in athletics (track and field)
Kenyan female cross country runners
20th-century Kenyan women